The Peru women's national football team represents Peru in international women's football and is controlled by the Peruvian Football Federation (FPF) (Federación Peruana de Fútbol in Spanish) as a part of the CONMEBOL federation.

Peru's best result in major international competitions was in the 1998 Sudamericano Femenino, where they achieved third place. La Blanquirroja is coached by Marta Tejedor and plays the majority of its games in the Estadio Nacional.

History

On 1996 the Peruvian Peruvian Football Federation created the Peruvian Primera División Femenina under de name of Metropolitan women's footbal championship (currently known as Liga Femenina). On that basis, in 1998 the federation gathered its very best players into a national team, whose first international appearance was the third South American Women's Football Championship played in Argentina.

Team image

Nicknames
The Peru women's national football team has been known or nicknamed as "La Blanquirroja" or "La Rojiblanca (The White And Red)".

Home stadium

Peru play its home matches on the Estadio Nacional del Perú.

Results and fixtures

The following is a list of match results in the last 12 months, as well as any future matches that have been scheduled.

Legend

2021

2022

Peru Results and Fixtures – Soccerway.com

Coaching staff
Current coaching staff

Manager history

Luis Cruzado (2003)
Lorena Bosmans (2006)
Jaime Duarte (2010)
 Marta Tejedor (2013–2016)
 Doriva Bueno (201?–2021)

Players

Current squad
The following players were called up for the 2022 Copa América Femenina.Caps and goals accurate up to and including 18 March 2021.Recent call ups

The following players were also named to a squad in the last 12 months.

Captains

Miryam Tristán (????–)

Competitive record
FIFA Women's World Cup*Draws include knockout matches decided on penalty kicks.Olympic Games*Draws include knockout matches decided on penalty kicks.CONMEBOL Copa América Femenina*Draws include knockout matches decided on penalty kicks.Pan American Games*Draws include knockout matches decided on penalty kicks.Bolivarian Games*Draws include knockout matches decided on penalty kicks.Youth Tournaments
South American U-20 Women's Championship*Draws include knockout matches decided on penalty kicks.South American U-17 Women's Football Championship*Draws include knockout matches decided on penalty kicks.''

See also

 Sport in Peru
 Football in Peru
 Women's football in Peru
 Peru men's national football team
 Peruvian women's football championship

References

External links
Official website
FIFA profile

Nat
South American women's national association football teams
women